The districts of Uganda are divided into 167 counties, 1 city council, and 23 municipal councils. Counties are divided into sub-counties. The counties are listed below, by district:

List

See also
 Regions of Uganda
 Districts of Uganda
 Sub-counties of Uganda
 Uganda Local Governments Association

References

 
Subdivisions of Uganda
Uganda, Counties
Uganda 2
Counties, Uganda